is a Japanese-only action RPG developed by Culture Brain. It is the third SNES Super Chinese game, being a sequel to Super Chinese World 2. It keeps the Beat'em-up battle system from the previous games, but gives the opportunity to play with other characters than Jack and Ryu, each having a different way of fighting.

External links

Role-playing video games
Super Chinese
Super Nintendo Entertainment System games
Super Nintendo Entertainment System-only games
Japan-exclusive video games
Multiplayer and single-player video games
Action role-playing video games
1995 video games
Video games developed in Japan